Hiwassee Dam High School (HDHS) in Murphy, North Carolina serves grades 9–12 and is one of three high schools in the Cherokee County Schools. As of 2007 it had a full-time teaching staff of 20 teachers giving an average of 11 students per teacher. Enrollment is about 160 students. By 2025, as a result of a May 2020 vote by the Cherokee County Board of Education, students from the county's three high schools will attend one high school.

Awards & Distinctions

References

External links 
List of high schools in North Carolina

Public high schools in North Carolina
Schools in Cherokee County, North Carolina